Acidoton is a genus of plant of the family   Euphorbiaceae first described as a genus in 1788. It is native to the Greater Antilles, Central America, and tropical South America.

Species

Formerly included
moved to other genera (Flueggea Jablonskia Margaritaria Meineckia Securinega )

References

Plukenetieae
Euphorbiaceae genera